The Cowley Courier Traveler is a local newspaper from Arkansas City, Kansas, United States.

History
The Arkansas City Traveler was one of two local newspapers that published in Cowley County, Kansas - the other being The Winfield Daily Courier.  It was owned by Stauffer Communications from 1924 until 1994, when Stauffer was acquired by Morris Communications. In 2001, Morris sold the paper to Winfield Publishing Company.

In 2017, The Arkansas City Traveler and The Winfield Daily Courier merged into a new publication named The Cowley Courier Traveler.

See also
 List of newspapers in Kansas

References

External links
 Current The Cowley Courier Traveler official website
 Former The Arkansas City Traveler website archived on the Wayback Machine at archive.org
 Former The Winfield Daily Courier website archived on the Wayback Machine at archive.org

Newspapers published in Kansas
Cowley County, Kansas